United States Army Garrison Fort Buchanan, Puerto Rico, is a United States Army installation in Puerto Rico. It is located in the metropolitan area of the capital, San Juan.

History
Puerto Rico was part of the Spanish Empire from the time of Christopher Columbus until the Spanish–American War. United States forces landed in Guánica on July 25, 1898. The last Spanish unit left the island the following October, and the Department of Puerto Rico was established. Upon the signing of the Treaty of Paris on December 10, 1898, Spain ceded Puerto Rico to the United States, and the island became an unincorporated United States territory.

The Puerto Rico Regiment
On July 1, 1899, “The Puerto Rico Regiment of Infantry, United States Army” was created. On July 1, 1901, Lieutenant Colonel James Anderson Buchanan took command of the regiment. He was later promoted to colonel on July 21, 1902, and to brigadier general in 1905. Buchanan served in Puerto Rico from 1898 to 1903 and Fort Buchanan was named after him.

Camp Buchanan
The Puerto Rico Regiment was officially designated as the 65th Infantry Regiment in 1920, after defending the Canal Zone during World War I. A tract of 300 acres approximately six miles on the south shore of San Juan Bay was acquired to provide the regiment with a training area. The site was established in 1923 as Camp Buchanan. It served as a target range and maneuver area for the U.S. Army and National Guard troops from 1923 to 1939. The 1st Battalion 51st Coast Artillery Regiment was also assigned to Camp Buchanan in 1939.

Fort Buchanan

In May 1940 the location was renamed Fort Buchanan. It was eventually expanded to 4,500 acres. During World War II, Fort Buchanan housed a depot supplying the Army Antilles Department. It also processed local troops through its replacement center. The industrial complex included pier facilities, ammunition storage areas and an extensive railroad network connecting the military installation to the Port of San Juan at San Juan Bay.

Puerto Rican soldiers being deployed during World War II and the Korean War were transported from the train station to the Army terminal at the Port of San Juan. At the time, Fort Buchanan served as a citizens training camp and soldier processing station.

After World War II the post was gradually reduced to its current size of 746 acres. Fort Buchanan remained a command depot with post facilities, a personnel center, and a special training center until closure as an Army post in 1966. On December 31, 1966, with the deactivation of the Antilles Command, Fort Buchanan passed to the control of the United States Navy.

On December 7, 1971, the Third U.S. Army resumed control of Fort Buchanan, and in 1973 the post came under direct control of the United States Army Forces Command (FORSCOM). Following the Department of Defense Unified Command Plan, Fort Buchanan came under control of United States Southern Command (SOUTHCOM). From 1999 to 2003 it was occupied by United States Army South (USARSO).

In 2002 Fort Buchanan became part of the Southeast Regional Office of the Installation Management Agency (IMA), and in 2003 it became an IMA Reserve installation. In 2006 it became a garrison under United States Army Installation Management Command, Southeast Region (IMCOM-SE).

On October 1, 2008, the Commanding General of the 81st Regional Readiness Command became Fort Buchanan's Senior Mission Commander under the United States Army Reserve Command (USARC).  Based on the December 2008 Unified Command Plan, Fort Buchanan currently falls under the United States Northern Command (USNORTHCOM) area of operations, under the direct control of the Installation Management Command, Atlantic Region (IMCOM-Atlantic).

On October 23, 2009, an explosion at the nearby Caribbean Petroleum Corporation caused two people to suffer minor injuries at Fort Buchanan, and four other people sought help for respiratory problems. The explosion caused minor damages in some facilities of the military installation.

In 2017 after the wake of Hurricane Maria, Fort Buchanan served as a command center during the recovery efforts. Military active duty, reserve and National Guard units from the continental United States were mobilized from Fort Buchanan all over the island for the emergency. Thousands of these service members were awarded the Humanitarian Service Medal for their disaster relief efforts. The United States Army Corps of Engineers also managed operations from Fort Buchanan.

Today
United States Army Garrison Fort Buchanan consists of 746.16 acres between the municipalities of Bayamón and Guaynabo, Puerto Rico with a real estate value estimated at $560 million. Fort Buchanan serves a population of approximately 130,000, including military personnel, their dependents, retirees, veterans, and the civilian workforce.
 
Fort Buchanan is host to a number of tenant activities, most of them branches from the United States Armed Forces Reserve Component such as the headquarters for the 1st Mission Support Command of the United States Army Reserve, the United States Navy Reserve Navy Operations Support Center Puerto Rico  (NOSC Puerto Rico) and the United States Marine Corps Reserve. The Puerto Rico National Guard is also present on the base. The Reserve Officer Training Corps (ROTC) has held leadership labs and other activities at Fort Buchanan. Other agencies at the base include the Army and Air Force Exchange Service (AAFES), Defense Commissary Agency (DECA), Rodriguez Army Health Clinic (RAHC), Veterinary Treatment Facility, Defense Military Pay Office (DMPO), and Defense Contracting Audit Agency.

Fort Buchanan also hosts a number of non-DoD organizations that provide services to soldiers, their dependents, and community members, including the Pentagon Federal Credit Union PenFed, Banco Popular de Puerto Rico, and AAFES Concessionaires. Fort Buchanan also provides support to United States Department of Homeland Security agencies such as the U.S. Customs and Border Protection.

Post Information

Support facilities on the base include:

 3 Department of Defense Education Activity Schools
Antilles Elementary School
Antilles Middle School
Antilles High School
 2 Military Family Housing Areas
 Coconut Grove - Enlisted and Company Grade Officer Housing
 Las Colinas - Senior Officer Housing
 Army and Air Force Exchange Service (AAFES)
 Post Exchange (PX)
 PXtra/Class Six 
 Gas Station
 Exchange Food Court
 Burger King
 Popeyes Fried Chicken
 Subway
 Starbucks 
 Taco Bell
 Concessions
 Barber Shop 
 Beauty Shop
 Don Rey Cigar
 Flower Shop 
 Exchange Mobile Center
 Exchange New Car Sales 
 GNC
 H&R Block
 Los Unidos Laundry/Alterations 
 Optical Shop 
 Optometry Clinic 
 Souvenir Shop 
 Banco Popular
 Base Library
 Borinquen Lounge & Patio
 Bowling Center
 Cabana Picnic Area
 Café 151
 Civilian Personnel Advisory Center (CPAC)
 Child Development Center
 Community Based Warrior Transition Unit (CBWTU)
 Community Club & Conference Center
 DeCA Commissary
 Defense Military Pay Office (DMPO)
 El Caney Lodge
 Fire Station
 Fort Buchanan Golf Course Complex
 Fort Buchanan Welcome Center & ID Card Office
 Las Casas Lake
 Logistics Readiness Center
 Maxie Williams Jr Field
 Mc Arthur Field
 Navy Operational Support Center Puerto Rico (NOSC Puerto Rico)
 Network Enterprise Center (NEC)
 Pentagon Federal Credit Union
 Post Chapel
 Post Office
 Ramos Hall
 Rodriguez Army Health Clinic (RACH) 
 Skate Park
 Sports & Fitness Center and Roberto Clemente Fitness Center annex
 Training Support Center
 Veterinary Services
 Water Spout Aquatics Center
 Youth Center

Armed Forces Reserve Center

The Armed Forces Reserve Center (AFRC) at Fort Buchanan accommodates the U.S. Army Reserve Headquarters and Headquarters Detachment (HHD) of the 339th Battalion, (the 393rd) and a Retention Office. The Puerto Rico Army National Guard Recruiting and Retention Division (R&R Div), the 480th Military Police Company and the Medical Section Cell C59. The United States Marine Corps Reserve relocated the Detachment 1, Landing Support Company, Combat Logistics Regiment-45, 4th Marine Logistics Group into this facility.  The Fort Buchanan Armed Forces Reserve Center serves about 400 personnel on a rotating basis, with a maximum of 250 members per weekend. This facility was named after senior civilian aide to the secretary of the Army for Puerto Rico Major General (Ret) Felix A. Santoni.

Joint Forces Headquarters Puerto Rico (JFHQPR-Puerto Rico National Guard)

A $33.5 million Readiness Center for the Puerto Rico National Guard at Fort Buchanan has been completed. This National Guard Readiness Center at Fort Buchanan includes a Metal Storage Building/Maintenance Training Bay, Simulation Center/Physical Training, Emergency Generator and Tank, Vehicle Wash Platform and a Helipad. The Puerto Rico National Guard will posthumously name this Readiness Center at Fort Buchanan after Korean War Veteran and former member of the 65th Infantry Regiment and Medal of Honor recipient Master Sergeant Juan E. Negrón.

Notable people
 Douglas Domenech - Assistant Secretary of the United States Department of the Interior for Office of Insular Affairs and former Virginia Secretary of Natural Resources, graduated from Antilles High School in 1973 at Fort Buchanan.
 Cesar Rodriguez - Retired United States Air Force officer and Gulf War combat pilot from 1981 to 2006, graduated from Antilles High School in 1977 at Fort Buchanan.
 Eurípides Rubio - United States Army captain and recipient Medal of Honor for his actions at the Vietnam War entered the Army at Fort Buchanan.
 Frances M. Vega - The first female soldier of Puerto Rican descent to have died in combat in the Iraq War graduated  from Antilles High School in 2001 on post. Fort Buchannan Gate #1 was named the SPC Frances M. Vega gate in her honor.
 Marcos Berríos - California Air National Guard mayor, served in the War in Afghanistan as a search and rescue pilot, aerospace engineer, selected for astronaut candidate in NASA Astronaut Group 23, graduated from Antilles High School in 1997 at Fort Buchanan.

Climate

Gallery

References

External links
 Fort Buchanan Home Page 
 Fort Buchanan MWR Page
 Rodriguez Army Health Clinic
Fort Buchanan at GlobalSecurity.org

1923 establishments in Puerto Rico
Buildings and structures in Bayamón, Puerto Rico
Buildings and structures in Guaynabo, Puerto Rico
Buchanan
Military facilities in Puerto Rico
Military installations established in 1923
Military installations of the United States in Puerto Rico